Corn fritters are fried cakes of a dough or batter made of, or containing a featured quantity of maize (corn). Originating in Native American cuisine, they are a traditional sweet and savory snack in the Southern United States, as well as Indonesia where they are known as perkedel jagung or bakwan jagung.

History
Native Americans had been using ground corn (maize) as food for thousands of years before European explorers arrived in the New World. Corn-based products, such as corn flatbread, arepa and cornbread were staple foods in Pre-Columbian Americas. Native Americans did not use deep frying techniques, however, which require ample supplies of cooking oil as well as equipment in which the oil can be heated to high temperatures.

European settlers learned recipes and processes for corn dishes from Native Americans, and soon devised their own cornmeal-based recipe variations of European breads made from grains available on that continent. The corn fritter probably was invented in the Southern United States, whose traditional cuisine contains a lot of deep fried foods.

On the other side of the world, maize seeds from the Americas were introduced into Southeast Asia in the late 16th century through Spanish and Portuguese traders. The plant thrived in the tropical climate of Indonesia, and soon became a staple food plant in drier areas of central and southeastern Indonesia, since it requires much less water than wet rice. Coconut and palm oil have been essential elements of Indonesian cuisine for centuries. The deep fried technique using palm oil was probably borrowed from Portuguese colonists; and Indonesia and Myanmar (Burma) both have their own types of corn fritter, respectively called perkedel jagung or bakwan jagung and pyaungbu kyaw.

Regional variations

Southern United States
Traditional corn fritters in the American South use corn kernels, egg, flour, milk, and melted butter. They can be deep fried, shallow fried, baked, and may be served with jam, fruit, honey, or cream. They may also be made with creamed corn, baked, and served with maple syrup. Corn fritters can be made to have a similar appearance to, and thus be mistaken for, johnnycake.

Indonesia

Indonesian corn fritters, a type of gorengan, are not sweet but savoury. They have a more granulated texture, as the corn kernels are not finely ground and blended into the dough, so they retain their kernel shapes. The fritter is made from fresh corn kernels, wheat flour, rice flour, celery, scallion, eggs, shallots, garlic, salt and pepper, and deep fried  in coconut oil. They are a popular snack and are often served as an appetizer.

Myanmar (Burma) 
Burmese corn fritters, called pyaungbu kyaw (ပြောင်းဖူးကြော်), are a type of Burmese fritter. Pyaungbu kyaw consists of corn kernels battered in flour and eggs and deep-fried as disk-like fritters. They are savory, and are similar to Indonesian bakwan jagung.

Peru 

Peruvian corn fritters, called torrejas de choclo, are made from choclo (Peruvian corn), an Andean variety of corn, pepper, onion and eggs. They can deep fry in vegetable oil and is usually served savory to accompany other local dishes as an appetizer.

See also 
Clam cake
Corn cookie
Hushpuppy
List of maize dishes

References

Snack foods
Maize dishes
Dishes featuring sweet corn
Cuisine of the Southern United States
Fritters